The RFU Knockout Cup was an English rugby union competition open to any member of the Rugby Football Union. First contested in 1971, it was the premier competition in English club rugby before the establishment of the English league structure in 1987.

The competition was replaced by the Anglo-Welsh Cup, involving 4 Welsh regional sides in addition to the 12 English Premiership clubs, beginning with the 2005–06 season.

History

Background
The RFU had long resisted national competitions as it was thought that they would encourage player payments. Thus, most club matches were only organised friendlies, with competitions such as the County Cups being the highest honours a club could win. The County Championship, established in 1889, was the only national competition for 82 years.

1971–75: RFU Knockout Cup
The first competition took place in the 1971-72 season, where Gloucester defeated Moseley in the final 17–6, to become the inaugural champions. Coventry RFC won two titles in succession in 1973 and 1974, followed by Bedford's championship win in 1975.

1976–88: John Player Cup
The competition gained its first sponsor in tobacco firm John Player & Sons in 1976.

Gosforth won the first two editions under this new name in 1976 and 1977. Gloucester won their second title in 1978. The competition was then dominated by Leicester, who won three championships in a row, until Gloucester won their third title in 1982. This was shared with Moseley after a 12–12 draw in extra time, and was the only time the cup was shared between two teams. Leicester were again in the final in 1983, but lost to Bristol. Leicester's record run was then broken by Bath from 1984 to 1987, who won the cup four times in a row, until Harlequins won their first in 1988.

1988–97: Pilkington Cup
The cup was named after glass manufacturing company Pilkington for the 1988-89 tournament.

Bath picked up from where they left off in the late 1980s, going onto win another six times from 1989 to 1996. Harlequins won their second title in 1991, and Leicester added to their three championships in 1993 and again in 1997.

1997–2000: Tetley's Bitter Cup
Tetley's Brewery became title sponsor in the 1997-98 season, naming the cup after their bitter.

Saracens won their first title, defeating Wasps in 1998. Wasps were again in the final in 1999, and defeated Newcastle to claim their first championship. Wasps also won the 2000 competition.

2000–05: Powergen Cup
In 2001, energy supplier Powergen became the final title sponsor.

Newcastle won the first Powergen Cup, defeating the Harlequins 30–27. London Irish won it for their first time the following season, and Gloucester won it for the first time since 1982 in 2003. Newcastle won in 2004, and in 2005, Leeds Tykes defeated Bath to win it for the first time.

Demise

Starting in 2005–06, the cup was replaced by a new format including only the twelve teams from the Guinness Premiership and the four Welsh regions, ending its status as an open competition. From this time until 2009, teams from the Championship and below played in the Powergen National Trophy.

List of winners

List of champions

* 1982 title shared between Gloucester and Moseley.

See also

 Anglo-Welsh Cup
 RFU Championship Cup
 EDF Energy Trophy
 RFU Intermediate Cup
 RFU Senior Vase
 RFU Junior Vase
 Rugby union in England

References

External links

 
Recurring sporting events established in 1971
Rugby union cup competitions in England
Premiership Rugby
Recurring sporting events disestablished in 2005
Defunct rugby union cup competitions